This is a list of American Wrestling Association attendance records. Established as the Minneapolis Boxing & Wrestling Club by Tony Stecher in 1933, it was among the first professional wrestling promotions in the United States. A founding member of the National Wrestling Alliance in 1948, Stecher controlled the NWA's "Minneapolis wrestling territory" which included much of the Great Lakes and Upper Midwestern United States. In 1959, Verne Gagne and Wally Karbo took control of the company and left the NWA the following year. The company was subsequently renamed the American Wrestling Association. With Gagne promoted as a legitimate rival to the NWA World Heavyweight Champion, the AWA closely matched the NWA in terms of attendances. In its heyday, the AWA was able to hold "stadium show" supercards at Comiskey Park, the International Amphitheater, Rosemont Horizon, Soldier Field and other major venues.

The AWA was considered one of the "Big Three", along with the National Wrestling Alliance and World Wide Wrestling Federation, during the "Territory-era" (1940s–1980s). Although its success continued into the early part of the 1980s wrestling boom, peaking with 23,000 fans at WrestleRock '86, the promotion was unable to compete against the national expansion of Vince McMahon's World Wrestling Federation, and eventually went bankrupt in 1991.

Events and attendances

Historical

Footnotes

References
General
 
 </ref>

Specific

External links
AWA Cards With Highest Claimed Attendance from The Internet Wrestling Database
Supercards & Tournaments: American Wrestling Association at ProWrestlingHistory.com
American Wrestling Association attendance records at Wrestlingdata.com

American Wrestling Association
Professional wrestling attendances
Attendance records